Major-General Christopher Colin Wilson CB CBE is a former British Army officer who became Director of Battlefield Manoeuvre and Master-General of the Ordnance.

Military career
Wilson was commissioned into the Royal Artillery in 1973. He was appointed the Senior Army Representative at the Royal College of Defence Studies in 2005. He was deployed as Deputy Commander, Combined Forces Command in Afghanistan in 2006 and became Director of Battlefield Manoeuvre and Master-General of the Ordnance in 2006 before retiring in May 2010.

He was also Colonel Commandant of the Royal Artillery.

References

|-
 

|-

Royal Artillery officers
Companions of the Order of the Bath
Commanders of the Order of the British Empire
Living people
Year of birth missing (living people)